The Climatiiformes is an order of extinct fish belonging to the class Acanthodii. Like most other "spiny sharks", the Climatiiformes had sharp spines. These animals were often fairly small in size and lived from the Late Silurian to the Early Carboniferous period. The type genus is Climatius. The order used to be subdivided into the suborders Climatiida and Diplacanthida, but subsequently Diplacanthida has been elevated to a separate order, the Diplacanthiformes. The Diplacanthiformes take their name from Diplacanthus, first described by Agassiz in 1843. Family Gyracanthidae is sometimes rejected from this order.

References

 

Acanthodii
Prehistoric fish orders
Paraphyletic groups